Misungwi or Missungwi or Isungwi is a ward in Misungwi District, Mwanza Region, Tanzania. It is the biggest town on the trunk road from Mwanza to Shinyanga. In 2016 the Tanzania National Bureau of Statistics report there were 34,612 people in the ward, from 30,728 in 2012.

Villages 
The ward has 39 villages.

 Misungwi "C"
 Misungwi "D"
 Kanisani
 Bariadi
 Majengo
 Masawe "A"
 Masawe "B"
 Masawe "C"
 Bukwaya
 Muungano.
 Mbela "A"
 Mbela "B"
 Mbela "C"
 Mbela "D"
 Misri
 Sekondari
 Misungwi "A".
 Misungwi "B"
 Mitindo "A"
 Mitindo “B”
 Polisi
 Iteja.
 Lumbaga.
 Kabila
 Bugunga.
 Mitindo "A"
 Mitindo “B”
 Mwamanga.
 Bugando.
 Machimbo.
 Misheni.
 Bukwaya.
 Mwambola.
 Mitindo.
 Mwamanyili.
 Itale.
 Mwankali.
 Ng'wambola 'B'
 Ng'wanghalanga

References

Populated places in Mwanza Region